Topaz is a Polish supermarket Eastern Poland. The company was founded in 1993, by Zbigniew Paczóski, the head office is located in Sokołów Podlaski.

Beginnings 
Initially, the company operated from one shop (originally in a converted garage) by the owner, in which he supplied the local residents with basic food and industry products. With time, more stores began to appear.

Topaz Express 
In May 2009, the network introduced a new sales style - Topaz Express franchise stores.

Currently 
Currently, the network consists of 45 retail outlets in 20 towns and around 30 Topaz Express franchise outlets, a company's confectionery and 2 fuel stations.

References 

Polish brands
Supermarkets of Poland
Retail companies established in 1993